The 2020 Big 12 Conference softball tournament was scheduled to be held May 8 through May 9, 2020 at ASA Hall of Fame Stadium in Oklahoma City, Oklahoma. The tournament winner would have earned the Big 12 Conference's automatic bid to the 2020 NCAA Division I softball tournament.

On March 12, 2020, the NCAA cancelled all winter and spring sports championships due to the coronavirus pandemic, thus cancelling the tournament.

References

Big 12 Conference softball tournament
Tournament
Big 12 softball tournament